The Esther Locke House is a historic house at the southeast corner of Spring and 3rd Streets in Hardy, Arkansas.  It is a large Plain Traditional rubble stone structure, with a gable roof and rubble stone foundation.  The dominant feature of its main facade is a recessed two-story porch.  Built in 1936–37, it is locally distinctive as a Depression-era structure built as a residence and rooming house.  The downstairs housed Esther and Norma Sue Locke, who owned the property, and there were seven rooms upstairs that were rented to long-term tenants.

The house was listed on the National Register of Historic Places in 1998.

See also
National Register of Historic Places listings in Sharp County, Arkansas

References

Houses on the National Register of Historic Places in Arkansas
Houses completed in 1937
Houses in Sharp County, Arkansas
National Register of Historic Places in Sharp County, Arkansas